Andreas Hugo Hoelgebaum Pereira (born 1 January 1996) is a professional footballer who plays as a midfielder for Premier League club Fulham.

Born in Duffel, Belgium, he began his youth career with nearby club Lommel. At the age of nine, he joined Dutch club PSV Eindhoven, before signing for Manchester United in November 2011. Pereira made his first Premier League appearance in March 2015. While at United, he spent time on loan at Spanish clubs Granada and Valencia, Italian club Lazio and Brazilian club Flamengo.

He played youth international football for both the country of his birth, Belgium, and his father's homeland, Brazil, before making his senior international debut for Brazil in September 2018.

Club career

Manchester United

Early years

The son of former Brazilian professional footballer Marcos Pereira, Andreas Pereira was born in Duffel, Belgium, while his father was a player there. He joined PSV Eindhoven in 2005, when he was nine years old. In 2011, after impressing at the Manchester United Premier Cup, he became a target for several big English clubs, including Arsenal, Chelsea and Liverpool, but a visit from Manchester United manager Alex Ferguson in November 2011 convinced Pereira to sign for the Old Trafford club.

Due to regulations regarding international transfers, the move could not be completed until Pereira's 16th birthday on 1 January 2012, and further complications with international clearance meant that his Manchester United debut was delayed until April 2012. He made his debut for the under-18s in a league match away to Sheffield Wednesday on 25 April 2012, but heavy rain meant the match had to be abandoned as a goalless draw after 35 minutes. He made two more appearances that season as the under-18s finished eighth out of 10 teams in their Premier Academy League group.

After signing as an academy scholar in July 2012, Pereira became a regular in the under-18s in the 2012–13 season, making 20 appearances and scoring five goals. He also got his first taste of reserve team football during the season, coming on as a substitute for James Weir in a 3–1 win over Oldham Athletic in the Manchester Senior Cup, followed by another substitute appearance against Liverpool in the semi-finals of the Professional Development League. In recognition of his performances, on 7 January 2013, shortly after his 17th birthday, Pereira received his first professional contract. Ahead of the 2013–14 season, Pereira was named as Manchester United's captain for their 2013 Milk Cup campaign, and was named Player of the Tournament for his three goals as Manchester United won the Premier Section. He went on to feature heavily for both the under-18s and the under-21s, and was ever present in the inaugural UEFA Youth League; he also scored twice in three appearances in the FA Youth Cup, including a curling, 25-yard effort against Burnley in the third round. For the under-21s, he appeared in 17 out of 21 league matches as Manchester United finished third; he then scored the only goal in the semi-final against Liverpool, only for the team to lose to Chelsea in the final.

2014–15 season
Pereira began the 2014–15 season with silverware as Manchester United beat Manchester City 4–1 in the final of the Manchester Senior Cup on 7 August 2014. He made his senior debut three weeks later, coming on as a half-time substitute for Saidy Janko in a 4–0 away defeat to Milton Keynes Dons in the second round of the League Cup. On 15 March 2015, Pereira made his Premier League debut against Tottenham Hotspur, coming on as a 77th-minute substitute for Juan Mata in a 3–0 win for United.

On 1 May, he signed a new contract with Manchester United until at least June 2018. Eighteen days later, Pereira was voted Manchester United's under-21 player of the year for 2014–15.

2015–16 season
On 21 July, Pereira scored his first goal for Manchester United's senior squad in the 3–1 win against the San Jose Earthquakes in the 2015 International Champions Cup, after coming on as a second-half substitute. He made his first competitive start for the senior team on 23 September 2015, in the third round of the League Cup, and scored a free kick in the eventual 3–0 win over Ipswich Town.

2016–17 season: Loan to Granada
On 26 August 2016, Pereira joined Spanish club Granada on a season-long loan deal. He made his debut in La Liga two days later, replacing Luís Martins in the 55th minute of a 5–1 loss at UD Las Palmas.

Pereira scored his first goal for the Nazaríes on 3 December, opening a 2–1 home win over fellow Andalusians Sevilla FC. On 6 February 2017, he netted the only goal of a win over Las Palmas at the Estadio Nuevo Los Cármenes, with a long-range strike. Eleven days later, he was again on the scoresheet for a 4–1 victory against Real Betis at the same ground, but was sent off for a push; he was banned for two games and the club fined €180.

2017–18 season: Loan to Valencia
On 1 September 2017, Valencia announced the arrival of Pereira to the club on a season-long loan deal. He made his debut in a 0–0 home draw against Atlético Madrid eight days later, and scored his only goal for Los Che on 15 October, with a long-range strike as a substitute to conclude a 6–3 win at Real Betis.

2018–19 season
On 2 March 2019, Pereira scored his first Premier League goal in a home match against Southampton. The goal later earned him Manchester United's goal of the season for 2018-19 season. He also recorded an assist for Romelu Lukaku in the same match. On 7 March 2019, Pereira was featured in the starting lineup during the historic Champions League Round of 16 (2nd Leg) win vs PSG, where the team was able to come back from a 2-goal deficit they conceded at home and win on away goals at the Parc des Princes, a record that has never been broken before.

2019–20 season
On 5 July 2019, it was announced that Pereira had signed a new four-year contract with the option to extend by a further year. On 11 August 2019, he started in Manchester United's opening day 4–0 win against Chelsea, in which he assisted Anthony Martial for the second goal. He scored his first goal of the season two months later, on 10 November 2019, in a 3–1 home win against Brighton.

2020–21 season: Loan to Lazio

On 2 October 2020, Lazio announced the arrival of Pereira to the club on a season-long loan. On 1 November 2020, He scored his first Serie A goal in a 4-3 away win against Torino.

2021–22 season: Loan to Flamengo
On 20 August 2021, Pereira joined Flamengo on a one-year loan. The Brazilian club agreed to pay €1m for the loan. In the final of Copa Libertadores 2021, he made a decisive mistake that caused Flamengo to lose against Palmeiras.

Fulham

On 11 July 2022, Fulham announced the signing of Pereira on a four-year contract, for an undisclosed fee, understood to be worth £10m with add-ons. He made his debut for Fulham on 6 August, starting and playing 89 minutes in a 2–2 home draw against Liverpool.

International career
Born in Belgium to a Brazilian father and a mother of German descent, Pereira is eligible to represent either Belgium or Brazil at international level. He initially represented Belgium at under-15, under-16 and under-17 levels, but has since stated, "My heart is Brazilian." He received his first Brazil call-up in 2014, joining the under-20 team on their successful Panda Cup campaign in China. At the 2015 FIFA U-20 World Cup in New Zealand, Pereira equalised in the final against Serbia, but Brazil lost 2–1 after extra time. In total, he scored twice in seven appearances at under-20 level. Pereira made one appearance and scored one goal for Brazil at under-23 level, in a friendly against South Africa in March 2016.

On 17 August 2018, he received his first senior call up for the friendly matches against the United States and El Salvador. He made his debut against El Salvador on 11 September, as the first player in over 100 years to play for Brazil having been born outside of the country.

Career statistics

Club

International

Honours
Brazil U20
FIFA U-20 World Cup runner-up: 2015

Individual
Denzil Haroun Reserve Team Player of the Year: 2014–15
Manchester United Goal of the Season: 2018–19 (vs. Southampton, 2 March 2019)

References

External links

Profile at the Fulham F.C. website
 
 
 

1996 births
Living people
People from Duffel
Belgian footballers
People with acquired Brazilian citizenship
Brazilian footballers
Association football midfielders
Manchester United F.C. players
Granada CF footballers
Valencia CF players
S.S. Lazio players
Fulham F.C. players
CR Flamengo footballers
Premier League players
La Liga players
Serie A players
Campeonato Brasileiro Série A players
Belgium youth international footballers
Brazil youth international footballers
Brazil under-20 international footballers
Brazil international footballers
Brazilian people of German descent
Belgian people of Brazilian descent
Belgian people of German descent
Expatriate footballers in England
Expatriate footballers in Italy
Expatriate footballers in Spain
Belgian expatriate footballers
Brazilian expatriate footballers
Belgian expatriate sportspeople in England
Brazilian expatriate sportspeople in England
Belgian expatriate sportspeople in Italy
Brazilian expatriate sportspeople in Italy
Belgian expatriate sportspeople in Spain
Brazilian expatriate sportspeople in Spain
Footballers from Antwerp Province